Clausnitzer Glacier is a tributary glacier flowing east from the Random Hills to enter Tinker Glacier just north of the Harrow Peaks, in Victoria Land. It was mapped by the United States Geological Survey from surveys and from U.S. Navy air photos, 1955–63, and named by the Advisory Committee on Antarctic Names for Frazer W. Clausnitzer, ionospheric physics scientist at McMurdo Station, winter 1966.

References
 

Glaciers of Victoria Land
Borchgrevink Coast